This is a list of notable residents of Arrah, Bhojpur, Bihar, India.

Nationalist and independence activists
 Babu Amar Singh
 Hare Krishna Singh
 Veer Kunwar Singh

Writers and scholars
 Acharya Shivpujan Sahay, writer
 Amitava Kumar, Journalist and writer 
 Anil Sinha, IPS
 Avinash Chandra Vidyarthi, Bhojpuri Writer
 Mithileshwar, writer
 Muni Lall, IPS
 Sachchidananda Sinha, lawyer and journalist
 Shashi Bhushan Sahai, IPS
 Kapil Muni Tiwary, Linguist and Professor of English in Yamen

Politicians

 Jagjivan Ram, 4th deputy Prime Minister of India
Meira Kumar, Former Lok Sabha Speaker
 Ram Subhag Singh, He was the leader of India's first opposition in the Lok Sabha
 Ram Vishnun Singh, Member of Legislative Assembly
 Amrendra Pratap Singh, Member of Legislative Assembly 
 Dinesh Kumar Singh, Member of Legislative Assembly
 Shri Bhagwan Singh Kushwaha, Former Rural Development Minister of Bihar

Entertainment
 Pawan Singh, Bhojpuri actor and singer
 S. H. Bihari, lyricist
 Satyakam Anand, actor
 Vishal Aditya Singh, actor and model
 Neeraj Pandey, Film Director
 Kumar Varun, Stand-up Comedian

Sports
 Rohit Raj, cricketer
People from Arrah